Dr. Denise G. Albe-Fessard 
(31 May 1916 – 7 May 2003) was a French neuroscientist best known for her basic research into the central nervous system pain pathways, clarifying the distinction between lateral and medial thalamic pain processing.

She graduated with a degree in engineering from the School of Physique et Chimie de Paris in 1937 and received a Doctor of Sciences degree from Paris University in 1950. She was named a Chevalier (Knight) of the Legion of Honour and an Officer of the Order of Merit. Early on, Albe-Fessard studied the electrical activity of electric fish. Her work on microelectrode recordings of a cat's cerebral cortex in the 1950s was one of the first intracellular recordings of a mammalian brain.

Education and early life 
Denise Albe-Fessard was born in Boulogne-Billancourt, Paris, France during the First World War to parents from farmer and artisan backgrounds. Her father was a railway engineer who aided in the construction of tracks that carried soldiers and ammunition to the front lines. She was the youngest child out of four and had the opportunity to receive the same education as her two brothers because this was more acceptable in Paris than it was in the provinces from which her family originated. 

At the age of 10, she passed a competitive scholarship examination in her state primary school and received a free secondary education.

She proceeded to earn an engineering degree at ESPCI Paris, specializing in physics under the advice of her brother not to pursue medicine due to the struggles that women in that field faced.

Career and research 
After graduating ESPCI Paris in 1937, she struggled to find work as a female physicist and joined Rhône-Poulenc as a chemist. After a month there, she quit and joined the Centre National de la Recherche Scientifique (CNRS) as a technical assistant for Daniel Auger, a plant electrophysiologist. Working with amplifiers to measure electrical potentials of Nitella introduced Albe-Fessard to the limitations of recording bio-electric phenomena. 

During her work with Daniel Auger, she met the nervous physiologist and electrophysiologist Alfred Fessard (1900-1982), whom she married in 1942. It was Albe-Fessard who constructed the electronic equipment that Fessard used to make the stimulators and amplifiers necessary for his study of electrophysiology. She went on to become the director of the physiological laboratory of nervous centers of the Sciences faculty.

Albe-Fessard chaired the scientific committee of the first international congress on pain in 1975 in Florence, Italy. From 1978 to 1984, she was a member of various other committees.

She was the first president of the International Association for the Study of Pain (IASP) between 1975–1978.

Honours and awards 

 Knight of the Legion of Honour (1973)
 Officer of the Ordre national du Mérite (1978) 
 Elected as the first president of the International Association for the Study of Pain (IASP) (1975-1978)

Publications
 Atlas stéréotaxique du diencéphale du rat blanc, 1966
 La Douleur : ses mécanismes et les bases de ses traitements, 1996

References

Further reading
 
 
 
 

1916 births
2003 deaths
ESPCI Paris alumni
French neuroscientists
French women neuroscientists
20th-century French women scientists
Scientists from Paris
Recipients of the Legion of Honour